Michael Roberts may refer to:

Michael Roberts (college principal) (died 1679), Principal of Jesus College, Oxford, 1648–1657
Michael Roberts (mathematician) (1817–1882), Irish mathematician  
Michael Roberts (writer) (1902–1948), British poet, writer, critic and broadcaster
Michael Roberts (historian) (1908–1996), British historian
Michael Roberts (politician) (1927–1983), British Conservative Party politician, Cardiff MP 1970–1983
R. Michael Roberts (born 1940), American biologist
Michael Roberts (priest) (born 1943), British Church of England priest and academic
Michael D. Roberts (born 1947), American actor
Michael Roberts (fashion journalist) (born 1947), British journalist
Michael Roberts (jockey) (born 1954), South African jockey
Michael Roberts (footballer) (born 1959), Australian rules footballer and TV journalist
Michael Symmons Roberts (born 1963), British writer
Mick Roberts (born 1979), rugby league player for the Brisbane Broncos
Michael Roberts (cricketer) (born 1989), English cricketer
Michael Roberts (American football) (born 1994), American football player
Michael Roberts, a character in Small Island

See also
Mike Roberts (disambiguation)